Ian Bronson Albery (born 21 September 1936) is an English theatre consultant, manager, and producer. He is a former chief executive of Sadler's Wells Theatre (1994-2002), and was in charge of the Donmar Warehouse from 1961 to 1989.

He is the son of Sir Donald Albery, a prolific theatre manager. From 1958 through 1972, Ian Albery served as stage manager, production manager, or technical director for more than 100 West End theatre productions, including:

 West Side Story
 Irma La Douce
 The World of Suzie Wong
 Oliver!
 The Miracle Worker
 Sparrers Can't Sing
 Beyond the Fringe
 La Bonne Soupe
 Blitz!
 Fiorello!
 A Severed Head
 The Poker Session
 Who's Afraid of Virginia Woolf?
 Instant Marriage
 Portrait of a Queen
 Jorrocks
 The Prime of Miss Jean Brodie
 The Italian Girl
 Hadrian VII
 Man of La Mancha
 Anne of Green Gables
 Conduct Unbecoming
 The Mandrake
 Poor Horace
 Popkiss

Albery has served as managing director at the Piccadilly Theatre, the vice-chairman of the Association of British Theatre Technicians, and as an executive member of the Society of West End Theatre.

Personal life
Albery married  actress Barbara Yu Ling Lee (died 1997) in 1966. They had two sons before the marriage ended in divorce. He has a daughter from a later relationship with costume designer Jenny Beavan. In 2003 he married Judy Monahan.

References 

1936 births
Living people